Giovanni Battista Viola (June 16, 1576 – August 10, 1622) was an Italian painter of the early Baroque period in Rome.

Biography
Giovanni was born in Bologna. His skills were initially noticed by Annibale Carracci. He collaborated with Domenichino in the Room of Appollo in Villa Aldobrandini in Frascati (1616–18), where Viola painted the landscapes and Domenichino, the figures. He appears to have worked for the Giustiniani in Bassano di Sutri. In 1612, he was sharing a house with Francesco Albani. In 1612, Viola married Silvia Gemelli, who was already mother to an Anna Gemelli, who in turn married Albani. Hence, Albani was Viola's stepson-in-law. Giulio Mancini commented in his writings that Viola was well respected for his landscape canvases, which were documented among the works in the collections of Cardinal Pietro Aldobrandini, Giustiniani, Cardinal Mazarin, and the Pamphilj. Louis XIV of France collected at least landscapes, now in the Louvre. He was a teacher of Bartolommeo Lotto and Pietro Paolo Bonzi (il Gobbo dalle Frutta), and would have been influential for Claude Lorraine. The biography of Amorini recounts that Viola died mortified after offending the Cardinal Ludovisi.

References

A Forgotten Landscape Painter: Giovanni Battista Viola, by Richard E. Spear. The Burlington Magazine (1980) pp. 298, 300–315.

External links

 Getty Museum of Art biography

1576 births
1622 deaths
Italian Baroque painters
16th-century Italian painters
Italian male painters
17th-century Italian painters
Painters from Bologna